The Conservatoire national supérieur d'art dramatique (CNSAD; English: National Academy of Dramatic Arts) is France's national drama academy in Paris and a constituent college of University PSL.

It is a higher education institution run by the French Ministry of Culture and, with an acceptance rate of two to three percent and an average graduating class of thirty students. Its alumni include: Jeanne Moreau, Isabelle Huppert, Carole Bouquet, Sebastian Roché, Jean-Paul Belmondo, Louis Garrel, Celine Sallette and Olivier Martinez.

History
The CNSAD was founded as a part of the Conservatoire de Paris in 1795, making it the oldest acting school in Continental Europe. The Conservatoire de Paris split in 1946, with one school for the dramatic arts, and the other for music and dance, known as the Conservatoire national supérieur de musique et de danse de Paris (CNSMDP).

Admissions
The CNSAD offers a three-year study program, with the CNSAD diploma awarded on completion. The school admits approximately thirty students per year (usually fifteen men and fifteen women), as well as some invited foreign trainees (stagiaires étrangers). The school has a rigorous three-round competitive selection process, with only two percent to three percent of applicants gaining admittance. A stage directing program was launched in 2001.

Location

Le Conservatoire, the school's main building, is located on the rue du Conservatoire in the 9th arrondissement of Paris. Its famous theatre, built in 1811 by the architect Delannoy, was the site of Hector Berlioz's debut opera, as well as the first French performances of Beethoven's Third and Fifth Symphonies.

References

External links
 cnsad.psl.eu, official website (in French—with one introductory page in English)

1795 establishments in France
Conservatoire de Paris
Drama schools in France
Education in Paris
Educational institutions established in 1795